John Jeffries (1745–1819) was a physician and scientist.

John Jeffries may also refer to:

 John Calvin Jeffries (born c. 1948), law professor
 John Jeffries II (1796–1876), American ophthalmic surgeon
 John Jeffries (judge) (1929-2019), former judge, local politician and senior civil servant

See also
 John Jeffries Award, awarded to Harry George Armstrong
 John Jeffreys (disambiguation)
 John Jeffrey (disambiguation)